Noordhoek is a seaside town in the Western Cape, South Africa, located below Chapman's Peak on the west coast of the Cape Peninsula and is approximately  to the south of Cape Town. The name "Noordhoek" was taken from Dutch and literally means "north corner". It was given this name in 1743 as being the northern corner of the Slangkop farm. The first permanent resident of European origin is Jaco Malan who built his house there. In 1857, the region was divided into six plots, most of which were bought by a single family, that of the de Villiers. Noordhoek nevertheless remains a predominantly rural area where farmers grow vegetables to supply ships calling at Simon's Town. It is best known for its shoreline and its long, wide, sandy beach, which stretches south to the neighbouring village of Kommetjie. Near the southern end of this beach is the wreck of the steamship "Kakapo", which ran aground in 1900, when the captain mistook Chapman's Peak for the Cape of Good Hope and put the helm over to port. 

Noordhoek can be accessed either from the scenic coastal road Chapman's Peak Drive, which leads out of Hout Bay or via the mountain road Ou Kaapse Weg which cuts through the Silvermine Nature Reserve - now part of the Table Mountain National Park. Noordhoek is a small scattered community of houses, often with sea views and has a large horse population as riding on the long sandy beach is common; the beach is a  stretch of fine white sand backed by Chapman's Peak and the Table Mountain National Park. Winds are often strong and the sea is cold and wild. The town consists of a riding stables and a scattering of villas in a wide grassy valley with oak trees. In the middle of this valley is the Noordhoek Farm Village, with craft shops, a children's playground, café, pub and restaurant.

Transport

Roads 

Noordhoek is accessed by two metropolitan routes within the Greater Cape Town metropolitan area, the M6 and M65.

The M6 links Noordhoek to Hout Bay and Cape Town in the north as ‘Noordhoek Main Road’ and Simon’s Town in the south-east as ‘Glencairn Expressway’ and the M64, better known as ‘Ou Kaapse Weg’ links Noordhoek to Westlake and Cape Town (via the M3 freeway) through the Steenberg mountains.

Gallery

References

External links
 
 

Suburbs of Cape Town
Surfing locations in South Africa